The Copland River is a river on the West Coast of the South Island of New Zealand.

A popular tramping track follows the river and leads to the Welcome Flat hot springs. The track leads onto the Copland Pass and the Copland Glacier.

The river lies within the Westland Tai Poutini National Park.

References

Westland District
Rivers of the West Coast, New Zealand
Westland Tai Poutini National Park
Rivers of New Zealand